Malaxa Mountain is a mountain at Malaxa on the island of Crete in the country of Greece.  This mountain feature is situated in northwestern coastal Crete in the vicinity of the city of Chania.  Trypali limestone is a dominant rock of Malaxa Mountain. The ancient city of Kydonia held sway over lands to the south of it across the Chania Plain all the way to Malaxa Mountain.

See also
 Kastelli Hill

Line notes

References
 H. Closs, Dietrich Hans Roeder, Klaus Schmidt (1978). Alps, Apennines, Hellenides: Geodynamic Investigation Along Geotraverses, Schweizerbart, 620 pp., .
 C. Michael Hogan, Cydonia, The Modern Antiquarian, Jan. 23, 2008

Mountains of Crete
Landforms of Chania (regional unit)